A polvorón (From , the Spanish word for powder, or dust) is a type of heavy, soft, and very crumbly Spanish shortbread made of flour, sugar, milk, and nuts (especially almonds). They are mostly produced in Andalusia, where there are about 70 factories that are part of a syndicate that produces polvorones and mantecados. Under the name mantecados, these sweets are a traditional preparation of other areas of the Iberian Peninsula as well.

Polvorones are popular holiday delicacies in all of Spain, Hispanic America and other Spanish-influenced countries around the world. Traditionally, they were prepared from September to January, but they are now available all year round.

Mantecado
Mantecado is a name for a variety of Spanish shortbreads that includes the polvorón. The names are often synonymous, but not all mantecados are polvorones.

In Cuba and Puerto Rico, mantecado is an ice cream and in Spain it may be also the name given to a kind of sweet sherbet. In the Philippines, mantecado is a popular traditional ice cream flavour, characterised as a mixture of vanilla and butter. It was served during the 29 September 1898 luncheon banquet that followed the Malolos Congress' ratification of the Philippine Declaration of Independence in June that year 1935.

Regional variations

Europe and Americas

Cuba
In Cuba, it is one of the most common flavors of ice cream. Cuba, being the Latin American country in the Caribbean where Spain had the most interest and influence, has adapted the flavors of mantecado or polvorones from Spain into a delicious and beloved flavor for Cuban ice cream. Known worldwide for the delicious flavoring, what some might call a Latin vanilla, this Cuban flavor has influenced ice cream flavors made in other Latin American places such as Puerto Rico.

Spain
Polvorones are a common Christmas dessert in Spain. Today, there are other options for the fat used in the sweet other than pig fat, like butter, as well as vegetarian polvorones and mantecados made with olive oil.

United States
Sometimes called Pan de Polvo, the sweet is made with anise in the south Texas region.

Asia

The Philippines

The Filipino version of polvorón (sometimes spelled "polboron" or "pulburon") uses a large amount of powdered milk which is left dry, as well as toasted flour, sugar, and butter or margarine instead of lard. In contrast to other polvorón, it has a very fine powder-like and dry consistency. A number of local variants on the traditional polvorón recipe have been made. Well-known variants include polvorón with kasuy (cashew nut), with pinipig (pounded and toasted young green rice, similar to crisped rice) and with malunggay leaves. Strawberry, chocolate-coated, ube (purple yam), peanut, and cookies and cream flavoured polvorón also exist.

See also
 List of shortbread biscuits and cookies
 Andalusian cuisine
 Cuisine of Valladolid
 Spanish cuisine

References

Andalusian cuisine
Christmas food
Christmas in Spain
Cookies
Latin American cuisine
Mexican desserts
Philippine desserts
Shortbread